Sir Matthew Wood, 1st Baronet (2 June 1768 – 25 September 1843) was a British Whig politician, Lord Mayor of London from 1815 to 1817, and from 1817 until his death in 1843 a reformist Member of Parliament.

Early life
Matthew Wood was the son of William Wood (died 1809), a serge maker from Exeter and Tiverton both in Devon, by his wife Catherine Cluse (died 1798). He was descended from the Wood family of Hareston in the parish of Brixton in Devon, which the family had inherited by marriage to the heiress of the Carslake family. The present Page-Wood baronets quarter the arms of Carslake Argent, a bull's head erased sable.

Political career
He was educated briefly at Blundell's School in Tiverton, before being obliged to help his ailing father. He was apprenticed to his cousin, an Exeter chemist and druggist, but moved to London in 1790 to set himself up in business.

Lord Mayor of London 
He was a member of the Worshipful Company of Fishmongers, of which he became Prime Warden, a member of the Court of Aldermen of the City of London, and served as Sheriff of the City of London for 1809 and as Lord Mayor of London from 1815 to 1817. He won popularity in the role by encouraging resistance to unpopular government measures and by his vigour as first magistrate in seeking to suppress the London underworld.

In December 1816, as Mayor he dispersed the Spa Fields riot, but went on to present the Regent a petition expressing the rioters demands for popular representation and reform.

Parliamentary reformer 
Wood was a founder member of the Hampden Club and of the Union Society for parliamentary reform in 1812. This was under aegis of John Cartwright, whose parliamentary election campaign he supported in 1814.

In June 1817, Wood was elected unopposed as a Member of Parliament for the City of London following the resignation of Harvey Christian Combe MP. He held the seat until his death in 1843.

Wood was a prominent partisan and adviser of Queen Caroline on her return to England in 1820. He congratulated her "upon her triumph over a wicked conspiracy against her honour and her life".  Greville noted acerbically in his diary on 7 June 1820:
The Queen arrived in London yesterday at seven o’clock… She travelled in an open landau, Alderman Wood sitting by her side and Lady Anne Hamilton and another woman opposite. Everybody was disgusted at the vulgarity of Wood in sitting in the place of honour, while the Duke of Hamilton’s sister was sitting backwards in the carriage.
In 1821, he was one of "seven wise men" that John Cartwright proposed to Jeremy Bentham act as "Guardians of Constitutional Reform", their reports and observations to concern "the entire Democracy or Commons of the United Kingdom". In addition to Bentham and himself, the other names Cartwright proposed were Sir Francis Burdett, Rev. William Draper; George Ensor, Rev. Richard Hayes, Robert Williams, and Matthew Wood.

The Wood inheritance 
Wood's radicalism belied his very 19th century propensity for improving his and his family's lot. The brush with royalty may have given him ideas about fixing his status and his family's inheritance prospects. In 1836 the 'Gloucester millionaire', banker James 'Jemmy' Wood, and one of the richest men in the country, died, and the Alderman became one of his heirs.  Matthew Wood was actually no relation to the millionaire despite their shared surname.  It seems Jemmy Wood's feeble-minded sister was an admirer of Queen Caroline and had taken a shine to the Alderman, to the extent of leaving property to him when she died.  Gaining more knowledge of the Gloucester Woods by living in his newly acquired property, the radical MP must have soon realized the vulnerability of the old banker and his fortune. In 1833, Jemmy gave the Alderman rent-free use of Hatherley House which the bank had acquired through a bankruptcy.  The mutual back scratching led to Wood allowing Jemmy to send all his mail under parliamentary franked cover. Soon, the Alderman was setting his sights on a baronetcy not only for himself, but also for the old millionaire as a kind of backstop.

The story of the will is a very complex one, but it involved leaving the entire estate valued at nearly £1,000,000, to Alderman Wood and three other executors.   Eventually, after a long court case against Wood and the other three executor-beneficiaries, on 20 Feb 1839 Judge Jenner in an extremely long and detailed verdict at the Arches Prerogative Court, London, 'decided that the terms were made by conspiracy and fraud, and ordered that the whole of the immense property should be divided amongst two relations'.  And yet, within a couple of years, this verdict was overturned on appeal by Lord Lyndhurst, and the four men (or family in the case of John Chadborn, Jemmy's lawyer, who had hanged himself in the interim) who had been accused of fraud were awarded what money and property was left after court costs were allowed for.  The inheritance formed the basis of the Wood family fortunes (now the Page Woods) and also that of John Chadborn's daughter's family, the Prices.

Alderman Wood was finally made a Baronet in 1837, of Hatherley House in Gloucestershire, the name of his country seat.

Marriage and children
On 5 November 1795 Wood married Maria Page, the daughter of John Page of Woodbridge in Suffolk, by whom he had six children:
 John-Page Wood (1796–1866), who became a Church of England vicar in Essex His daughter Katharine Wood (1846–1921) was better known by her married name of Katharine O'Shea. Popularly known as Kitty O'Shea, her relationship with the Irish leader Charles Stewart Parnell led to a political scandal which caused his downfall. John's son Evelyn Wood (1838–1919) was a Field Marshal and a recipient of the Victoria Cross.
 Maria-Elizabeth Wood (born 1798)
 Catharine Wood (born 1799)
 William Wood, 1st Baron Hatherley (1801–1881), a barrister and Liberal MP who served as Lord Chancellor from 1868 to 1872
 Western Wood (1804–1863), MP for the City of London 1861–63
 Henry-Wright Wood (born 1806), died an infant

References

External links 

 
 

1768 births
1843 deaths
People educated at Blundell's School
Whig (British political party) MPs for English constituencies
People from the Borough of Tewkesbury
UK MPs 1812–1818
UK MPs 1818–1820
UK MPs 1820–1826
UK MPs 1826–1830
UK MPs 1830–1831
UK MPs 1831–1832
UK MPs 1832–1835
UK MPs 1835–1837
UK MPs 1837–1841
UK MPs 1841–1847
Baronets in the Baronetage of the United Kingdom
Sheriffs of the City of London
19th-century lord mayors of London
19th-century English politicians